Podgorica City Stadium is an all-seater multi-purpose stadium in Podgorica, Montenegro. Although its seating capacity changed over the years due to several renovations, as of 2019 it has 11,050 seats. The stadium is the home ground of the Montenegrin national football team and Budućnost.

History
Podgorica City Stadium was built in 1945, following World War II. Before the war, Budućnost and other clubs from Podgorica played their matches in a field near that location.

The stadium's original capacity was around 5,000 spectators. The stadium burned down completely in 1952, but was later rebuilt, with a new capacity of about 17,000 seats. The new stadium has four stands—west, east, south and north.

In 1989, floodlights were installed in the City Stadium in Podgorica (then known as Titograd). During the 1980s, the main stand (west) was reconstructed. The new stand has a seating capacity of 6,000 and a modern roof.

After the breakup of SFR Yugoslavia, the stadium underwent additional construction work. The east stand was torn down, and a new north stand was built. Capacity was reduced to 12,000.

On 27 March 2015, the stadium was the site of an abandoned match when the UEFA Euro 2016 qualifier between Montenegro and Russia was dismissed by the referees to ensure the safety of the players. Russian goalkeeper Igor Akinfeev had been struck in the head by a flare and was sent to a hospital as a result. Russia was awarded a 3-0 result by UEFA as a result of the match abandonment.

The north stand is the home of Budućnost fans, the popular Varvari (Barbarians). Varvari often account for a large percentage of the attendance at games featuring Budućnost. They are the largest ultras group in Montenegro.

Stands
Since 2006, Podgorica City Stadium has had four stands. From 1992 to 2006, there were three stands (after the old east stand was torn down). Below are the approximate capacities of each stand with technical details.

Pitch and floodlights

The pitch measures 105 by 70 meters. The stadium is well known for close distance between pitch and stands. The Pitch was totally renovated in 2014 and today is among the best football pitches in the Balkans.

Floodlights were installed in 1989 for the first nighttime match, Budućnost-Rad (First League, 28 May 1989). Twenty years later, new 1900 lux floodlights were installed.

Tenants

During its history, the Podgorica City Stadium was used by a few clubs and the Football Association of Montenegro.

It is the host stadium for the Montenegro national football team.

Before the independence of Montenegro, the Podgorica City Stadium hosted the final of the Republic Cup of Montenegro. Following this tradition, Podgorica City Stadium is now the host venue of every Montenegrin Cup final.

Clubs which played their host matches at the Podgorica City Stadium are:

1945–present: FK Budućnost Podgorica
1953–1997: OFK Titograd

Records
First match: Budućnost-Sutjeska, friendly game, 3 May 1945
First official match: Budućnost-Arsenal Tivat, Montenegrin Republic League, 20 April 1946
First match in the First League: Budućnost-Dinamo Zagreb, Yugoslav First League, 25 August 1946
First match under the floodlights: Budućnost-Rad, Yugoslav First League, 28 May 1989
First international match: Budućnost-Tirana, friendly game, 7 January 1946
First official international match: Yugoslavia-Luxembourg, Euro 1972 qualifiers, 27 October 1971
First match of Montenegrin national team: Montenegro-Hungary, friendly game, 24 March 2007
Highest attendance: 20,000-Budućnost-Hajduk Split, Yugoslav First League, 27 August 1975

Highest attendances and notable matches

Notable matches played at the stadium include:

Before 2006
Yugoslavia-Luxembourg, Euro 1972 qualifiers, 27 October 1971 - att: 10,022
Budućnost-Hajduk Split, Yugoslav First League, 27 August 1975 - att: 20,000
Yugoslavia-Wales, Euro 1984 qualifiers, 15 December 1982 - att: 12,090
Budućnost-Deportivo La Coruña, Intertoto Cup, 9 July 2005 - att: 10,000

After 2006
Montenegro-Hungary, 24 March 2007 - att: 12,000
Montenegro-Italy, World Cup 2010 qualifiers, 28 March 2009 - att: 11,500
Montenegro-England, Euro 2012 qualifiers, 7 October 2011 - att: 11,500
Montenegro-England, World Cup 2014 qualifiers, 26 March 2013 - att: 13,000

Controversies and accidents
During the history, stadium in Podgorica was a place of numerous accidental situations, especially on FK Budućnost matches. Crowd violence escalated in the early 1970s, and after that—in the new century.

Budućnost games
In 2004, during a First League Budućnost-Partizan match, blocks, construction materials and similar objects were thrown from the north stand to the pitch and the match was halted for 15 minutes. A year later, the Budućnost-Red Star Belgrade match was suspended for two hours after home supporters (Varvari) threw tear gas on the pitch and, after that, attacked visitors' ultras. In spring 2006, there was crowd violence in a match between Budućnost and Zeta. In the Montenegrin First League, numerous matches of FK Budućnost were suspended due to crowd violence or crowd-invasion to the pitch.

Montenegro games
With the full crowd at every important match, and the architecture of the stands which are only four meters away from the pitch-lines, games of Montenegrin national team are playing in the highly-electric atmosphere. During the past years, Montenegrin FA is sanctioned by UEFA and FIFA in numerous occasions.

In 2011, after the Montenegro-England match, Montenegrin ultras intruded upon the pitch. During the game, missiles and flares were hurled at goalkeeper Joe Hart while he was in front of Ultra Montenegro group. The same thing occurred a year later in the match between Montenegro and Poland.

On 27 March 2015, Montenegro had a home match against Russia. The match was abandoned after 67 minutes due to crowd violence (during the match, the Russian goalkeeper was hit by Dmitri Kombarov, who was hit by an object). The original score was 0-0 and Russia missed a penalty moments before the match was abandoned. Russian goalkeeper Igor Akinfeev was hit by a flare, causing a second 33-minute delay. After that game, barriers were constructed in the upper portions of the stadium to prevent similar incidents in the future.

See also
FK Budućnost Podgorica 
Montenegrin First League
Montenegrin Derby

References

Buildings and structures in Podgorica
Football venues in Montenegro
Football venues in Serbia and Montenegro
Football venues in Yugoslavia
Montenegro
Multi-purpose stadiums in Montenegro
FK Budućnost Podgorica
Sport in Podgorica
Sports venues completed in 1945
1945 establishments in Montenegro